The Isle of Man Government is the government of the Isle of Man. The formal head of the Isle of Man Government is the Lieutenant Governor, the personal representative of Charles III. The executive head is the Chief Minister.

Douglas, the largest town in the Isle of Man, is its capital and seat of government, where most Government offices and the parliament chambers (Tynwald) are located.

The Civil Service has more than 2,000 employees and the total number of public sector employees including civil servants, teachers, nurses, police, etc. was 7,413 full time equivalent at 31 March 2019. This is just under 10% of the population of the Island and 21% of the working population. This does not include any military forces, as defence is the constitutional responsibility of the United Kingdom.

Government structure
The Government consists of eight departments, seven statutory boards, and numerous other governmental and quasi-independent agencies. The departments all report directly to the Council of Ministers through their respective minister.  Departments 'sponsor' other public bodies to enable a conduit into the Council of Ministers.  This arrangement extends to Tynwald and its branches for public bodies that do not have a member of Tynwald on their board.

Council of Ministers
Attorney General's Chambers
General Registry (Isle of Man Courts and Tribunals)
Isle of Man Information Commissioner
Manx Industrial Relations Service
Cabinet Office
Public Services Commission
Safeguarding Board
Department of Education, Sport and Culture
Culture Vannin (Manx Heritage Foundation)
Isle of Man Arts Council
Isle of Man Sport (Isle of Man Sports Council)
Swimming Pool Authorities
Department for Enterprise 
Isle of Man Post Office
Manx National Heritage (Manx Museum and National Trust)
Department of Environment, Food and Agriculture
Isle of Man Office of Fair Trading
Planning Committee
Road Transport and Licensing Committee
Department of Health and Social Care
 Manx Care
Department of Home Affairs
Communications and Utilities Regulatory Authority
Financial Intelligence Unit
Department of Infrastructure
Manx Utilities Authority
Local government
The Treasury
Isle of Man Financial Services Authority
Isle of Man Gambling Supervision Commission
Manx Lottery Trust
Public Sector Pensions Authority

Government personnel

Departments

 Cabinet Office (Oik Coonceil ny Shirveishee)
Minister for the Cabinet Office – Kate Lord-Breenan MHK
Chief Secretary (as accounting officer): Caldric Randall (interim) 
Department of Education, Sport and Culture (Rheynn Ynsee Spoyrt as Cultoor)
Minister for Education, Sport and Culture (Shirveishagh son Ynsee Spoyrt as Cultoor): Julie Edge MHK
Chief Executive: Graham Kinrade
Department for Enterprise (Rheynn Gastid Dellal)
Minister for Enterprise (Shirveishagh son Gastid Dellal): Lawrie Hooper MHK
Chief Executive: Mark Lewin
Department of Environment, Food and Agriculture (Rheynn Chymmyltaght, Bee as Eirinys)
Minister for Environment, Food and Agriculture (Shirveishagh son Chymmyltaght, Bee as Eirinys): Clare Barber MHK
Chief Executive: Steven Stanley (interim)
Department of Health and Social Care (Rheynn Slaynt as Kiarail y Theay)
Minister for Health and Social Care (Shirveishagh son Slaynt as Kiarail y Theay): Rob Callister MHK
Chief Executive: Stuart Quayle (interim)
Department of Home Affairs (Rheynn Cooishyn Sthie)
Minister for Justice and Home Affairs (Shirveishagh son Jeerys as Cooishyn Sthie): Jane Poole-Wilson MHK
Chief Executive: Dan Davies
Department of Infrastructure (Rheynn Bun-troggalys) 
Minister for Infrastructure (Shirveishagh son Bun-troggalys): Chris Thomas MHK
Chief Executive: Emily Curphey (interim)
The Treasury (Yn Tashtee)
Minister for the Treasury (Shirveishagh Tashtee): Alex Allinson MHK
Chief Financial Officer: David Catlow (interim)

Statutory boards
Communications and Utilities Regulatory Authority (Lught-reill son Gurneil Chellinsh as Bun-shirveishyn)
Non-voting Member of Tynwald: Ann Corlett MHK 
Chief Executive: Ivan Kiely
Isle of Man Financial Services Authority (Lught-Reill Shirveishyn Argidoil Ellan Vannin)
Chair: Lillian Boyle
Chief Executive: Bettina Roth
Isle of Man Gambling Supervision Commission
Chair: Jon Allen
Deputy Chair: David Butterworth
Chief Executive: Steve Brennan
Isle of Man Office of Fair Trading (Oik Dellal Cair Ellan Vannin)
Chair: John Wannenburgh MHK
Vice Chair: Vacant
Director: Ian Mansell
Isle of Man Post Office (Oik Postagh Ellan Vannin)
Chair: Stu Peters MHK
Vice Chair: Diane Kelsey MLC
Chief Executive: Simon Kneen
Manx Care (Kiarail Vannin)
Chair: Andrew Foster CBE
Chief Executive: Teresa Cope
Manx Utilities Authority (Bun Shirveishyn Vannin)
Chair: Tim Johnston MHK
Vice Chair: Peter Greenhill MLC
Chief Executive: Philip King
Public Sector Pensions Authority
Chair: Jerry Carter
Vice Chair: Kate Lord-Breenan MHK (ex-officio as Chair of the Public Services Commission)
Employer representative: Rob Mercer MLC
Chief Executive: Ian Murray

Offices

Attorney General's Chambers
HM Attorney General: Walter Wannenburgh
General Registry (Isle of Man Courts and Tribunals)
Chief Registrar: Colin Cowley (acting)
Isle of Man Information Commissioner (Barrantagh Fysseree)
Information Commissioner: Iain McDonald

Other agencies
Culture Vannin (Manx Heritage Foundation)
Chair: Chris Thomas MHK
Vice Chair: Marlene Maska MLC
Director: Dr Breesha Maddrell
Financial Intelligence Unit (Unnid Tushtag Argidoil)
Chair: HM Attorney General
Isle of Man Arts Council
Chair: Marlene Maska MLC
Isle of Man Sport (Isle of Man Sports Council)
Executive Chair: Sarah Corlett
Manx Industrial Relations Service
Manx Lottery Trust
Chair: Sarah Kelly
Manx National Heritage (Manx Museum and National Trust)
Chair: Jonathan Hall
Executive Director: Connie Lovel
Public Services Commission
Chair: Kate Lord-Breenan MHK
Vice Chair: Jane Poole-Wilson MLC
Secretary: Julie Bradley (interim)
Road Transport Licensing Committee (Bing Kied Carbid)
Chair: Brendan O'Friel
Vice Chair: David Sellick
Secretary: Noel Capewell
Safeguarding Board
Independent Chair: Lesley Walker
Swimming Pool Authorities
Local Government

Brief history

Lieutenant Governor
Before modern times the government of the Isle of Man was in the hands of the Governor (or Lieutenant Governor), who was the representative of the Lord of Man, assisted by his Council, consisting of the other permanent officials (the Bishop, Archdeacon, Deemsters, Attorney General, etc.).  The Council evolved into the Legislative Council, the upper chamber of Tynwald, the parliament of the Isle of Man.

After the Revestment in 1765 the Lieutenant Governor and his officials were the agents of the British Government, and not democratically responsible to the Manx people. Conflict between the House of Keys (popularly elected after 1866) and the Lieutenant Governor came to a head during the tenure of George Somerset (1902–18).

Council of Ministers
After World War I the Lieutenant Governor gradually ceded control to Tynwald, a process guided by the reports of commissions and other bodies in 1911, 1959 and 1969. An Executive Council, chaired by him and including members of Tynwald, was established in 1949, and gradually thereafter became the effective government of the Island. Finance and the police came under local control between 1958 and 1976.  The Lieutenant Governor ceased to chair the Executive Council in 1980, being replaced by a chairman elected by Tynwald, and the Council was reconstituted in 1985 to include the chairmen of the eight principal Boards; in 1986 they were given the title 'Minister' and the chairman was styled 'Chief Minister'. In 1990 the Council was renamed the 'Council of Ministers'.

Departments
During the 19th century several bodies, which came to be known as 'Boards of Tynwald', were created to exercise functions under democratic control. These included the Board of Education (1872), Highway Board (1874), Asylums Board (1888), Government Property Trustees (1891) and Local Government Board (1894).  However, although direct taxation was levied by Tynwald, the Boards' freedom of action before the 1960s was limited by the Lieutenant Governor's control of the Island's budget and his power to appoint certain of their members.

The structure of the Boards of Tynwald, along with other bodies variously called 'Statutory Boards' and 'Commercial Boards', became increasingly unwieldy after the 1950s, and was eventually reformed in the 1980s, when a system of 'ministerial government' was set up.

The Departments and Statutory Boards which existed before the reorganisation in 2010, and their predecessors, are shown below:

Treasury, 1985–present
Finance Board, 1961–1985
Department of Agriculture, Fisheries and Forestry, 1986–2010
Board of Agriculture and Fisheries, 1946–86
Board of Agriculture, 1914–1946
Fisheries Board, 1927–1946
Fishery Conservators, 1882–1927
Forestry, Mines and Lands Board, 1950–86
Common Lands Board, 1915–50
Trustees of the Common Lands, 1866–1915
Department of Education, 1987–2010
Isle of Man Board of Education, 1946–2009
Board of Education, 1872–99
Council of Education, 1899–1946
Isle of Man Education Authority, 1923–68
Isle of Man Central Education Authority, 1920–23 

Department of Health and Social Security, 1986–2010
Health Services Board, 1948–86
Mental Hospital Board, 1932–48
Asylums Board, 1888–1932
Board of Social Security, 1970–86
Board of Social Services, 1946–70
Health Insurance and Pensions Board, 1939–46
Old Age Pensions and National Health Insurance Board, 1920–39
Department of Transport, 2004–2010
Department of Highways, Ports and Properties 1986–2004
Isle of Man Highway and Transport Board, 1946–86
Highway Board, 1874–1946
Committee of Highways, 1776–1874 
Isle of Man Harbour Board, 1948–86
Isle of Man Harbour Commissioners, 1872–1948
Commissioners for Harbours, 1771–1872
Isle of Man Airports Board, 1948–86
Government Property Trustees, 1891–1986
Department of Home Affairs, since 1986
Home Affairs Board, 1981–86
Isle of Man Police Board, 1962–81
Isle of Man Broadcasting Commission, 1965–81
Civil Defence Commission, 1955–81
Department of Trade and Industry, 1996–2010
Department of Industry, 1986–1996
Industry Board, 1981–86
Department of Local Government and the Environment, 1986–2010
Local Government Board, 1894–1986
Department of Tourism and Leisure, 1994–2010
Department of Tourism and Transport, 1986–2004
Tourist Board, 1952–86
Publicity Board, 1931–52
Board of Advertising, 1904–31
Advertising Committee, 1897–1904
Isle of Man Passenger Transport Board, 1982–86
Manx Electric Railway Board, 1957–82
Isle of Man Office of Fair Trading, since 1998
Board of Consumer Affairs (1981–1998)
Consumer Council (1972–1981)
Financial Supervision Commission, since 1982
Insurance and Pensions Authority, since 1996
Insurance Authority, 1986–96
Isle of Man Post Office (1993)
Isle of Man Post Office Authority (1972–93)
Isle of Man Water and Sewerage Authority, since 2010
Isle of Man Water Authority (1985–2010)
Isle of Man Water and Gas Authority (1974–1985)
Isle of Man Water Authority (1972–1974)
Isle of Man Gas Authority (1972–1974)
Isle of Man Water Board (1946–1972)
Manx Electricity Authority, since 1983
Isle of Man Electricity Board (1932–1984)
Communications Commission (1989)
Telecommunications Commission (1985–1989)
Gambling Supervision Commission, up to present

References

External links

Government of the Isle of Man
Isle of Man
European governments